Santa Rosa Downtown station (known as Santa Rosa–Railroad Square during planning) is a Sonoma–Marin Area Rail Transit train station in Santa Rosa. It opened to SMART preview service on July 1, 2017; full commuter service commenced on August 25, 2017. It is located west of Wilson Street between 4th and 5th Streets, across the U.S. Route 101 freeway from downtown at the site of the ex-Northwestern Pacific Railroad station building. The station is the focal point of the Railroad Square Historic District, a National Register of Historic Places historic district designated in 1979.

History

The original Northwestern Pacific Railroad (NWP) Depot was built in 1903. Surviving the 1906 San Francisco earthquake, the station was eventually served by ten trains a day. Increased automobile ownership and highway construction led to decline of rail use in Sonoma County, thus leading to disuse of the facility as a passenger terminal around 1958. Alfred Hitchcock's 1943 film Shadow of a Doubt featured scenes filmed at the original NWP depot.

In 2008, the Handcar Regatta, a handcar race and arts festival, was put on in the Square utilizing the old tracks. The event continued annually between 2008 and 2011, but was not able to continue because of increased construction associated with the future SMART rail service.

References

External links

SMART - Stations

Transportation in Santa Rosa, California
Railway stations in the United States opened in 1903
Railway stations in the United States opened in 2017
Sonoma-Marin Area Rail Transit stations in Sonoma County
Buildings and structures in Santa Rosa, California
Former Northwestern Pacific Railroad stations